The women's cross country mountain biking competition at the 2022 Commonwealth Games in Birmingham, England will be held on 3 August in the Cannock Chase Forest.

Schedule
The schedule is as follows:

All times are British Summer Time (UTC+1).

Results
The results were as follows:

References

Women's cross-country
Mountain biking at the Commonwealth Games
2022 in mountain biking